This is a list of the extreme points of Asia, the points that are farther north, south, east or west than any other location on the continent.

Asia

 Northernmost Point — Cape Fligely, Prince Rudolf Island, Franz Josef Land, Russia (81°52'N)
 Franz Josef Land is near the ill-defined border between Europe and Asia
 if it is not considered a part of Asia, then the northernmost point is Arctic Cape,  Komsomolets Island (81°17'N)
 Southernmost Point — Pamana Island, Indonesia (11°00'S)
 When Cocos (Keeling) Islands included as part of Southeast Asia, then South Island (12°04'S)
 Westernmost Point — Cape Baba, Turkey (26°4'E)²
 Easternmost Point — Big Diomede, Russia (169°03'W)³

Asia (mainland)

 Northernmost Point — Cape Chelyuskin, Russia (77°43'N)
 Southernmost Point — Tanjung Piai, Malaysia (1°16'N)
 Westernmost Point — Cape Baba, Turkey (26°4'E)
 Easternmost Point — Cape Dezhnev (East Cape), Russia (169°40'W)³

See also 
Geography of Asia
Extreme points of the world
Extreme points of Eurasia
Extreme points of Afghanistan
Extreme points of Bangladesh
Extreme points of China
Extreme points of Hong Kong
Extreme points of India
Extreme points of Indonesia
Extreme points of Japan
Extreme points of Jordan
Extreme points of South Korea
Extreme points of Mongolia
Extreme points of Pakistan
Extreme points of the Philippines
Extreme points of Russia
Extreme points of Singapore
Extreme points of Taiwan

Notes
² The Turkish islands in the Aegean and Mediterranean Seas are considered part of Europe.

³ The 180th meridian passes through Asia, meaning that these points are in the Western Hemisphere.

References

 
Geography of Asia
Asia